Oliveirinha is a civil parish in Aveiro Municipality, Aveiro District, Portugal. The population in 2011 was 4,817, in an area of 12.07 km2.

References

Freguesias of Aveiro, Portugal